Tore Ruud Hofstad (born 9 August 1979) is a Norwegian former cross-country skier who competed from 1998 to 2010. A freestyle specialist, Hofstad is best noted as a member of the Norwegian relay team during three successful FIS Nordic World Ski Championship campaigns.

In total, Hofstad won four gold medals in the World Ski Championships; 4 × 10 km relay in 2003, 2005 and 2009 and team sprint in 2005. Hofstad won n additional two World Championship medals; one silver in the 20 km double pursuit in 2003 and a bronze medal on the 15 km freestyle in 2005.

Hofstad has eight individual victories from 2001 to 2005 and presently skis for Lillehammer SK. He suffered long term illness that kept him out for the entire 2008 season, which was diognised as TWAR. In 2009 he was part of the record-setting Norwegian relay team which won the men's 4 × 10 km relay for a record fifth consecutive time. Hofstad expressed joy in being able to prove his doubters wrong, after he had performed well on the third leg, gaining over ten seconds on Germany's Franz Göring.

Hofstad announced his retirement from professional cross-country skiing in July 2010.

Hofstad announced he will be launching a comeback attempt in 2012.

Cross-country skiing results
All results are sourced from the International Ski Federation (FIS).

Olympic Games

World Championships
 6 medals – (4 gold, 1 silver, 1 bronze)

World Cup

Season standings

Individual podiums
 1 victory 
 4 podiums

Team podiums
 5 victories  
 10 podiums

References

External links

1979 births
Living people
People from Eidsvoll
Norwegian male cross-country skiers
Olympic cross-country skiers of Norway
Cross-country skiers at the 2006 Winter Olympics
FIS Nordic World Ski Championships medalists in cross-country skiing
Sportspeople from Viken (county)